Srihari Nataraj (born 16 January 2001) is an Indian swimmer. He represented India at the 2019 World Aquatics Championships in Gwangju, South Korea. He qualified for Tokyo Summer Olympics after FINA approved his 'A' standard qualification time in men's 100m backstroke time trial at the Sette Colli Trophy in Rome.

In 2017, he competed in short course swimming at the Asian Indoor and Martial Arts Games held in Ashgabat, Turkmenistan.

In 2018, he represented India at the Commonwealth Games held in Gold Coast, Australia. A few months later, he competed at the 2018 Asian Games held in Jakarta, Indonesia. In the same year, he also competed in the boys' 50 metre backstroke, boys' 100 metre backstroke and boys' 200 metre backstroke events at the 2018 Summer Youth Olympics held in Buenos Aires, Argentina.

2022 Commonwealth Games
Day one of the 2022 Commonwealth Games, held in July and August in Birmingham, England, Nataraj swam a time of 54.68 seconds in the preliminaries of the 100 metre backstroke and qualified for the semifinals ranking fifth. With a time of 54.55 seconds in the semifinals, he qualified for the final the following day ranking seventh. In the final, he lowered his time to 54.31 seconds and placed seventh. On the third day, in the preliminaries of the 50 metre backstroke, he qualified for the semifinals of the event with a time of 25.52 seconds. He ranked eighth across both semifinals heats with a time of 25.38 seconds and qualified for the final. He lowered his time to 25.23 seconds in the final and placed fifth. Two days later, he set an Indian record of 2:00.84 in the preliminaries of the 200 metre backstroke, ranked ninth overall, and did not qualify for the event final.

References

External links 
 

Living people
2001 births
Swimmers from Bangalore
Indian male swimmers
Male backstroke swimmers
Asian Games competitors for India
Swimmers at the 2018 Asian Games
Swimmers at the 2018 Summer Youth Olympics
Swimmers at the 2018 Commonwealth Games
Swimmers at the 2022 Commonwealth Games
Swimmers at the 2020 Summer Olympics
Commonwealth Games competitors for India
South Asian Games medalists in swimming
South Asian Games gold medalists for India
South Asian Games silver medalists for India
South Asian Games bronze medalists for India
Olympic swimmers of India
21st-century Indian people